Carbon County School District #2 is a public school district based in Saratoga, Wyoming, United States.

Geography
Carbon County School District #2 serves the eastern portion of Carbon County, including the following communities:

Incorporated places
Town of Elk Mountain
Town of Encampment
Town of Hanna
Town of Medicine Bow
Town of Riverside
Town of Saratoga
Unincorporated places
Arlington
Walcott

Schools
Grades 7-12
H.E.M. Junior/Senior High School
Saratoga Middle/High School
Grades K-6
Elk Mountain Elementary School
Hanna Elementary School
Medicine Bow Elementary School
Saratoga Elementary School
Grades K-12
Encampment K-12 School

Administration

The superintendent of the district is Darrin Jennings as of the 2022-23 school year.

Student demographics
The following figures are as of October 1, 2009.

Total District Enrollment: 648
Student enrollment by gender
Male: 357 (55.09%)
Female: 291 (44.91%)
Student enrollment by ethnicity
American Indian or Alaska Native: 1 (0.15%)
Black or African American: 2 (0.31%)
Hispanic or Latino: 44 (6.79%)
Native Hawaiian or Other Pacific Islander: 1 (0.15%)
Two or More Races: 5 (0.77%)
White: 595 (91.82%)

See also
List of school districts in Wyoming

References

External links
Carbon County School District #2 – official site.

Education in Carbon County, Wyoming
School districts in Wyoming